Láhko National Park is a national park in the municipalities of Gildeskål, Meløy, and Beiarn in Nordland county, Norway. The park contains unique geological features, including Norway's largest area of karst and caves. Rare plants and charales are also found inside the park.

References

National parks of Norway
Protected areas established in 2012
2012 establishments in Norway
Protected areas of Nordland
Gildeskål
Beiarn
Meløy